This is a list of characters for the manga and anime series Ultimate Otaku Teacher.

Characters

Main characters

A 24-year-old hardcore otaku who spends his days at home working to improve his anime blog until he is forced by his sister to become a teacher at his alma mater. Junichiro is a physics major who published a paper that caused a huge turmoil at the scientific world when he was just 17. It proposed a theory to create a teleportation device in the same fashion of Doraemon'''s "Anywhere Door". Despite being ridiculed by academics, all efforts to disprove the theory so far have failed, although it may take centuries for mankind to develop the technology necessary to assemble it.
Despite being scouted to work at the most important research centers in the world, Junichiro claims to suffer from a disease called "YD" that "only lets him do what he yearns to do", thus he declined all of their offers. However, after spending a few weeks working as a teacher, he is convinced by Koyomi Hiiragi to work at her school. Since then, Junichiro splits his time between making use of his unusual methods to reform stray students and focusing on his hobbies and sometimes finding a way to integrate one into the other, usually through the use of competitive video games. He also has a habit of giving nicknames to the people he meets over the course of his teaching adventures.

Junichiro's younger sister who is always angry at her brother's antics. Her hobby is batting practice, and she is the only person whom Junichiro really fears. She is also responsible for all the family's finances and forbids Junichiro from buying anything without her approval. Despite all the trouble he causes her, Suzune is very fond of him and wants to take care of him forever. She has a habit of hitting others, usually Junichiro, with her bat when she's angry or upset with them.

Higashi Shinmei High School

A former delinquent leader of the Black Oracle gang who hated the world, because of its non-existence of heroes. However, after a bit of inspiration from Junichiro, where he tells her over an online chat-channel, “If there are no heroes, become one yourself,” she decides to reinvent herself as a voice-actress. Junichiro nicknames her .

Another delinquent from the Black Oracle gang who bullies Kanō in an attempt to get her to return to her delinquent ways. After receiving a “bullying lesson” from Junichirou however, she ends up befriending Kanoe and decides to follow her example; wishing to become a famous chef in the future. Junichiro nicknames her "Wicked Blondie".

An anime original character, who's the class representative of Minako's class. A Meganekko who initially hates Kagami for not taking job seriously, until she came to know him better. She was the reason why Jun'ichirou was fired, she shouted when he confronted him, and the image captured became the evidence against him.

Hiiragi Academy

Icho Branch

Koyomi is the chairman of Hiiragi Academy. She believes that Japan is a country too boring by her standards, and her goal is to transform it into a more amusing place. She hires Junichiro upon learning of his teaching methods, and always supports his schemes when they pique her interest, no matter how absurd they seem. Junichiro nicknames her .

Makina is the student council president and captain of the Kendo Club at Icho Academy who has the power to expel teachers who do not meet her standards. Despite that, she is usually dragged by Junichiro to take part in his antics against her will much to her chagrin. Junichiro nicknames her "Twintails" (  (In the English re-dub, she is called "Twin-tailed Weirdo")). She has a little brother named Kazuya, whom she practically raises by herself.

Nanami is a large, aggressive boy who lost his reason in life after he is forced to quit baseball due to an injury. Thanks to Junichiro, Nanami learns to like soccer and becomes a member of the Icho Academy soccer club. He is usually seen arguing with Makina, and encouraging Kōtarō. He is a previous member of Black Oracle. Due to his muscular and powerful build, Junichiro nicknames him .

Sachiko is a student who never appears at school until Junichiro is tasked by Makina to bring her back to classes. He learns that she is one of his favorite manga writers, who wrote Shuumatsu Gakuen. Her works are signed under the pen name . Her nickname from Junichiro is "Kisaki-sensei" (騎咲 先生 Kisaki-sensei).''

Junichiro's partner in the MMORPG "Ouroboros" under the name . They did not know each others' true identities until Junichiro learns that he is another of his absent students. Kōtarō loves crossdressing, and when dressed as a girl, even boys who know his secret usually skip a beat on seeing him, to the point that Koyomi forbids him from dressing as a boy when at school. He initially refuses to return to school over his fear of being rejected again, but after a heated duel with Junichiro in which the latter sacrifices his own player account, he manages to gain the self-confidence to accept himself. Thanks to Junichiro's encouragement, Kōtarō manages to have his friends accept him as he is and he returns to school.

Kiriko works in a maid cafe named Heart-On-Heart, which Kagami visits frequently, but is forced to quit when Makina discovers it, as students from Icho are forbidden to have part-time jobs, until Junichiro helps her to convince Makina to make an exception. Junichiro nicknames her  because she serves him french fries.

Kanan is a friend of Suzune's, who Suzune wanted Junichiro to help her with physics. She was a girl who used to rarely speak due to having a voice that sounds like an anime character, earning her the nickname  from Junichiro. She used her cell phone to communicate before Junichiro helped her overcome her fear of being ridiculed for her voice.

She is the treasurer of Icho Academy's student council, thanks to her ability to see the value in almost anything. She is also the daughter of a family who owns a gaming company known as KMC, and that she has been forced into a political marriage between her company and another trying to buy her out. Junichiro nicknames her  (In the english re-dub, she is called "Money Bags".)

Taki’s primary idol opponent of the Familin Ranger Brothers Squadron event, getting a perfect score, but is defeated by Nagaru (substituting for Taki) who also sung a perfect score; resulting in Nagaru’s victory due to a tie always going to the reigning champion. It is later revealed that Moemi is actually a student of Icho Academy when Junichiro comes across her during Icho Academy’s training-camp at the beach. Her nickname is "Wild Dollar".
Sadamitsu Fuwa
A boasting freshman student and an old friend of Madoka. He holds a grudge against the people of the main campus for not accepting him as a student, and does everything he can to be one of the students Junichiro chooses for the SS group war against the main campus; even garnering enough votes to be the number one candidate initially. Despite having done everything perfectly however, he failed to leave a unique impression on the students voting and ended up not getting chosen. His nickname is "Loser Flag".

Main Branch

Koyomi's cousin and the Chairman of Hiragi Academy's main branch. She runs her school as a prison where the students are forced to compete against each other with the least ranked ones suffering severe prejudice from their higher ranked peers and suffering risk of being expelled. Bent on stopping Alice's tyranny, Junichiro bets his own freedom to challenge her, and she agrees to relinquish her post of chairman to him should he win. With this purpose, Junichiro transfers to her school along with a team composed of Suzune, Makina, Sachiko, Kōtarō and Nanami with the task of defeating all other students and assimilate their groups in a period of three months. Junichiro nicknames her as "Brioche Rolls", as her hairlocks look like such to him. Once Junichiro wins the bet, she refuses to give up, and he allows her to remain the chairman with the condition of looking for a way to make the school a fun place for everyone, promising to have a rematch against her once she does it.

Junichiro's underclassman who worked as a teacher at several schools across the United States before transferring to the main branch. He is the homeroom teacher for the school's top ranked students and his skills at gaming are on par with him. He ends up being Junichiro's last opponent in the group war, becoming the final victor upon defeating him.

A short, first-year, genius girl who has the unique ability to do anything as long as she has seen it accomplished just once. She also has a rough time telling people apart; having to rely on smell and taste to differentiate people from one another. Junichiro first met Reiko when she arrived at KEC as a one-day intern; set-up by Koyomi to give Reiko a taste of Junichiro’s “interesting” hobbies. She reappears later on hiding in Junichiro's classroom from Shirakawa Nami who had been looking for Reiko to drag back to the main campus.
Mimori Kichou
A third-year student, and reporter, nicknamed the "Teacher Killer," of the Newspaper Club. Kichou writes her articles based solely upon half-truths and exaggerations regarding certain teachers that catch her eye which, as a result, causes most of the teachers she writes about to leave the school. Due to her newswriting skills, Junichiro has decided to call her "Blogs Girl." Junichiro defeats her by broadcasting his life throughout the internet, and then offering himself to work as a maid for whoever is the winner of a quiz about himself, shocking her, and the entire country.
Nami Shirakawa
An emotionless student and the personification of Alice’s prison ideal for the main campus; brain-washed to follow every command Alice forces upon her. She first meets Junichiro when she shows him a photograph of Mukyou Reiko; trying to find the run-away to bring back to the main campus. After being defeated by Reiko in a basketball match, she realizes she enjoys playing an "interesting" game, softening her attitude towards Reiko. She's nicknamed "Machine Girl".
Subaru Akatsuki
A love-sick student, nicknamed the "Unrequited Love-Warrior," who claims to suffer from a "deadly" disease, resulting in her “to die if one does not love.” The disease allows Subaru to become stronger depending on how much unrequited love she is currently experiencing. Subaru has a very complex form of synesthesia, which allows her to feel other people’s thoughts, feelings, colors and tastes. She sets her eyes on Junichiro after witnessing his declaration to become the Hiragi Academy's principal. Her nickname is "KS Girl".
Todoroki
A large and intimidating "shark-tooth" student and the leader of Team Titan. He first appears before Nami and Reiko's Team White Princess; having switched places with their original opponent to force White Princess into becoming their followers after beating them into submission through a soccer game. Half way through the game however, it comes to a halt as Nami decides to make Team White Princess part of Junichiro’s group; setting the stage for Junichiro to battle Team Titan for the second half of the soccer game. After he and his team become part of Junichiro's group, unexpectedly becoming the key player in a seduction match against Team Legend. His nickname is "Football Brat"
Shou Narasawa
A freshman member of Team White Princess who was forced to play a soccer game against Team Titan, but ends up as part of Junichiro's group after Nami made team White Princess his child. When Junichiro and his students are transferred to the E-rank dormitory, Narasawa acts as the guide that shows them around the dorm, and later that night, Narasawa has a heart-to-heart talk with Junichiro when the later joins him on the dorm’s roof. His nickname is "Decohead".
Kazuki Toono
A glass-wearing freshman member of Team White Princess who was forced to play a soccer game against Team Titan, but ends up as part of Junichiro's group after Nami made team White Princess his child.
Uekusa
The leader of Team Noble Garden whose forte is gardening. Uekusa and her team tends to farm fields as the food suppliers for the E-rank dormitory, and go about teaching Junichiro and company on how to become an accomplished farmer. Her nickname is "Komatsu Girl".
Kuujou Daiki
A Team Blue Corps student who looks down on those who don’t work hard for game matches. He appears before students of the E-rank dormitory with a candle and gas canister; trying to burn the food harvest of the recently expelled, Team Noble Garden. Junichiro however, steps in moments before he could burn the product and challenges Daiki to revoke Noble Garden’s expulsion, defeating him in a water polo match.
Kaito Aizawa
A game-loving third-year student. He is the leader of Team Blue Corps, and is one who considers himself to be a huge fan of Junichiro. He first appears alongside Tendou as they watch, from afar, Junichiro’s group defeating Team Titan in soccer; looking forward to Blue Corps' eventual encounter with the teacher. His nickname is "Self-Proclaimed Fan".

Other characters

A past colleague of Junichiro who created and directs CERM, a Physics Particle Research Laboratory established in Geneva, Switzerland, in an attempt to disprove Junichiro's theory on creating a teleportation device.

A former student from the same high-school class as Junichiro. In the past, Yamato was the only member of the school's science club until Junichiro decided to join it to learn how to make a Dokodemo Door; and ended up being taught physics by Yamato in the process.
Hell Gates

CEO of the largest game company in the world, Activision Frigate and Madoka's political fiancé.

The younger brother of Makina Momozono.

A ghost haunting one of Hiragi Academy's training camps, and loves to read manga to pass the time. She is given the nickname "Ghost Artist" due to her ambition of wanting to create her own manga. Matome encounters Junichiro when he stumbles upon her atop a stack of manga in the training camp's library, and asks him to help her "pass" on to the afterlife to which Junichiro deduces that it has something to do with the manga Matome had been reading all this time.
Nagare and Taki Komiya
 
They are 15-year-old twins. Junichiro meets the first twin, Taki, at a game arcade during summer vacation. Here, Taki invites Junichiro to play in the arcade with her as a thank you for getting Momozono, who was trying to send her home, off her tail, but are interrupted when a group of thugs appear in the area. However, it turns out that these delinquents are actually all friends of Taki, and that she is the established leader of their gang, Black Oracle Neo; reformed from Kanou’s original Black Oracle gang.
The second twin, Nagare, turns out to be the idol singer of a group known as 5th Queens where she later calls up Junichiro to meet him personally; asking him to get Taki out of the gang. Taki's nickname is "Leader", Nagare's nickname is "Idol-Sis".

The chief maid of the Heart-On-Heart café.
Kasane Kuon
Kasane was Junichiro's childhood friend and it was hinted that they were even closer than that. She always had a sick condition since childhood and died when she turned 17, but Junichiro claims that he is responsible for her death as well.
Nayuta Kuon
Kasane's younger sister who appears before Junichiro intending to kill him in order to avenge her, as she holds him responsible for her death. She puts a bracelet on the teacher's wrist that can't be removed unless he clears a series of games she prepares to him, and will inject a deadly poison on him should he fails. In preparation for her revenge, she studied not only Junichiro's profile, but those regarding all his students and friends.

References

Ultimate Otaku Teacher